A list of notable flat horse races which take place annually in the United Arab Emirates, including all conditions races which currently hold Group 1, 2 or 3 status.

Group 1

Group 2

Group 3

Listed races

References
  – Flat races in UAE, 2014-2015.

Horse racing-related lists
 
Horse races